Rowbarrow Hundred or Rowberrow Hundred was a hundred in the county of Dorset, England, containing the following parishes:

Langton Matravers
Studland
Swanage
Worth Matravers

See also
 List of hundreds in Dorset

Sources
Boswell, Edward, 1833: The Civil Division of the County of Dorset (published on CD by Archive CD Books Ltd, 1992)
Hutchins, John, History of Dorset, vols 1-4 (3rd ed 1861–70; reprinted by EP Publishing, Wakefield, 1973)
Mills, A. D., 1977, 1980, 1989: Place Names of Dorset, parts 1–3. English Place Name Society: Survey of English Place Names vols LII, LIII and 59/60

External links
  Vision of Britain - Rowberrow Hundred

Hundreds of Dorset